William Boakye Akoto is a Ghanaian Politician and a member of the Third Parliament of the Fourth Republic of Ghana representing the Birim North Constituency in the

Eastern Region.

Early life and education 
Akoto was born at Birim North in the Eastern Region of Ghana. He attended the University of Toronto and obtained his PhD.

Politics 
Akoto was first elected into Parliament on the Ticket of the New Patriotic Party during the December 2000 Ghanaian General Elections.  He polled 20,577 votes out of the 40,255 valid votes cast representing 51.10%. He was beaten in the Parties primaries elections by Ms. Esther Obeng Dapaah

Career 
Akoto was a former publisher of the African Connection Newspaper in Toronto. He is also a former member of Parliament for the Birim North Constituency in the Eastern Region of Ghana.

References 

Living people
Ghanaian MPs 2001–2005
New Patriotic Party politicians
People from Eastern Region (Ghana)
Ghanaian publishers (people)
Government ministers of Ghana
Year of birth missing (living people)